The Smith, later Reardon Smith Baronetcy, of Appledore in the County of Devon, is a title in the Baronetage of the United Kingdom. It was created on 1 July 1920 for the shipowner and coal exporter William Smith. The second Baronet assumed in 1929 by deed poll the additional surname of Reardon.

Smith, later Reardon Smith baronets, of Appledore (1920)
Sir William Reardon Smith, 1st Baronet (1856–1935)
Sir Willie Reardon Smith, 2nd Baronet (1887–1950)
Sir William Reardon Reardon Smith, 3rd Baronet (1911–1995)
Sir (William) Antony John Reardon Smith, 4th Baronet (1937–2022)
Sir William Nicolas Henry Reardon Smith, presumed 5th Baronet (born 1963)

References

Kidd, Charles, Williamson, David (editors). Debrett's Peerage and Baronetage (1990 edition). New York: St Martin's Press, 1990, 

Reardon Smith